The 2014 VCU Rams baseball team will be the 44th season of the university fielding a varsity baseball program, and will represent Virginia Commonwealth University in the 2014 NCAA Division I baseball season. It will be the Rams' second season playing in the Atlantic 10 Conference.

It will be the third season of Shawn Stiffler as head coach for the program.

Personnel

2014 roster

Schedule 

! style="background:#000;color:#f8b800;"| Regular Season
|- valign="top" 

|- bgcolor="#ccffcc"
| 1 || 02/14/14 || vs. (Georgia Tech Invitational) || Chandler Stadium || 9–4 || D. Conception (1–0) || M. Boyle (0–1) || none || 1,021 || 1–0 || —
|- bgcolor="#ccffcc"
| 2 || 02/15/14 || vs. Old Dominion(Georgia Tech Invitational) || Chandler Stadium || 6–3 || L. Kanuik (1–0) || B. Gero (0–1) || M. Lees (1) || 856 || 2–0 || —
|- bgcolor="#ccffcc"
| 3 || 02/16/14 || at (Georgia Tech Invitational) || Chandler Stadium || 5–3 || M. Blanchard (1–0) || J. Heddinger (0–1) || T. Gill (1) || 1,167 || 3–0 || —
|-

|-  style="text-align:center; background:#ccffcc;"
| 6 || 03/01/13 || vs. (Charleston Crab House Shootout) || Riley Park || 12-1 || H. Dwyer (3-0) || D. Roland (0-3)|| none ||  125 || 6-0|| 0-0
|-  style="text-align:center; background:#ccffcc"
| 7 || 03/02/13 || @ The Citadel(Charleston Crab House Shootout) || Riley Park || 11-6 || T. Buckley (1-0) || J. Reeves (1-1) ||none||  240|| 7-0 || 0-0
|-  style="text-align:center; background:#ccffcc"
| 8 || 03/03/13 || vs. (Charleston Crab House Shootout) || Riley Park ||6-4|| R. Farrar (3-0) || A. Belfiglio (0-1) || M. Lees (5) ||  150 || 8-0 || 0-0
|-  style="text-align:center; background:#ccffcc"
| 9 || 03/05/13 ||  || The Diamond || 4-2 ||T. Marino (1-0) || T. Love (0-1) || M. Lees(6)  ||  176 || 9-0 || 0-0
|- align="center" bgcolor="#ffbbb"
| 10 || 03/08/13 || at  || Brooks Field || 3-9 || M. Batts (2-0)  || H. Dwyer (3-1) || None || 713 || 9-1 || 0-0
|- align="center" bgcolor="#ffbbb"
| 11 || 03/09/13 || at UNC Wilmington || Brooks Field || 2-7 || J. Ramsey (1-2)|| T. Buckley (1-1) || None || 976 || 9-2 || 0-0
|- align="center" bgcolor="#ffbbb"
| 12 || 03/10/13 || at UNC Wilmington || Brooks Field || 2-3 ||  MacDonald (2-0)  || R. Farrar (3-1) || Livengood (1) || 1,037 || 9-3 || 0-0
|-  style="text-align:center; background:#ccffcc"
| 13 || 03/11/13 ||  || The Diamond || 11-8|| S. Greene (1-0)  || C. Smith (0-2)|| None || 210 || 10-3 || 0-0
|- align="center" bgcolor="#ffbbb"
| 14 || 03/15/13 ||  || The Diamond || 1-3 || McGee (2-0) || H. Dwyer (3-2) || None ||  255 || 10-4|| 0-0
|-  style="text-align:center; background:#ccffcc"
| 15 || 03/16/13 || Monmouth || The Diamond || 8-3 || T. Buckley (2-1)  || Smith (0-3) || S. Greene(2)||  250 || 11-4 || 0-0
|- align="center" bgcolor="#ffbbb"
| 16 || 03/17/13 || Monmouth || The Diamond || 1-7 || Yunginger (2-0)  || R. Farrar (3-2) || Hunt(1) ||  199 || 11-5 || 0-0
|-  style="text-align:center; background:#ccffcc;"
| 17 || 03/19/13 ||  || The Diamond || 4-3 || M. Lees (1-0)  || Brey (1-1) || None|| 237 || 12-5 || 0-0
|- align="center" bgcolor="#ffbbb"
| 18 || 03/20/13 || Rutgers || The Diamond || 6-9 || Corsi (2-3) || L. Kanuik (1-1)|| None ||  227 || 12-6 || 0-0
|- align="center" bgcolor="#ffbbb"
| 19 || 03/22/13 || * || The Diamond || 4-6 || Stout  (4-2)  || H. Dwyer (3-3) || BYERLY(2) ||  214 || 12-7 || 0-1
|- align="center" bgcolor="#ffbbb"
| 20 || 03/23/13 || Butler* || The Diamond || 3-4 || Kramp (5-0)  || R. Farrar (3-3) || Byerly(3) || 222 || 12-8 || 0-2
|- align="center" bgcolor="#ffbbb"
| 21 || 03/23/13 ||  Butler* || The Diamond || 4-7|| Laing (1-1)  || S. Greene (1-1) || Byerly(4) ||  299 || 12-9 || 0-3
|- align="center" bgcolor="#ffbbb"
| 22 || 03/26/13 ||  at #1 North Carolina || Boshamer Stadium || 2-3 || C. McCue (5-0)  || M. Lees (1-1) || None ||  365 || 12-10 || 0-3
|- bgcolor="#ccffcc"
| 23 || 03/29/13 ||  at * || Hayes Stadium || 5-2 || H. Dwyer (4-3)  || T. Barnette (1-2) || None ||  1,089 || 13-10 || 1-3
|- align="center" bgcolor="#ffbbb"
| 24 || 03/30/13 ||  at Charlotte* || Hayes Stadium || 8-9 || J. Hudson (2-0)  || M. Lees (1-2) || None ||  1,141 || 13-11 || 1-4
|- bgcolor="#ccffcc"
| 25 || 03/30/13 ||  at Charlotte* || Hayes Stadium || 4-3 || L. Kanuik (2-1)  || S. Geohegan (1-1) || None ||  1,148 || 14-11 || 2-4
|-

|- align="center" bgcolor="#ffbbb"
| 26 || 04/02/13 || at Virginia Tech || English Field || 5-11 || J. Joyce (4-1)  || D. Black (0-1)  || None  || 1,042  || 14-12  || 2-4
|- align="center" bgcolor="#ffbbb"
| 27 || 04/05/13 || at  || Gray–Minor Stadium || 2-6 || C. Bach (2-2) || H. Dwyer (4-4)  || None  || 187 || 14-13  || 2-4
|- align="center" bgcolor="#ffbbb"
| 28 || 04/06/13 || at VMI || Gray–Minor Stadium || 4-5 || J. Garrett (2-2)  || M. Lees (1-3)  || None  || 234 || 14-14 || 2-4
|- bgcolor="#ccffcc"
| 29 || 04/07/13 || at VMI || Gray–Minor Stadium || 8-4 || L. Kanuik (3-1)  || J. Brown (3-1)  || None  || 222 || 15-14 || 2-4
|- align="center" bgcolor="#ffbbb"
| 30 || 04/09/13 || at  || Shipley Field || 5-6 || B. Casas (2-0) || A. Absher (0-1) || None  || 357 || 15-15 || 2-4
|- bgcolor="#ccffcc"
| 31 || 04/12/13 || * || The Diamond || 2-1 ||M. Lees (2-3)'   || P. Peterson (1-4)  || None  || 335 || 16-15 || 3-4
|- align="center" bgcolor="#ffbbb"
| 32 || 04/13/13 || Temple* || The Diamond || 1-5 || E. Peterson (5-0)  || R. Farrar (4-4) || None || 340 || 16-16 || 3-5
|- align="center" bgcolor=""
| 33 || 04/14/13 || Temple* || The Diamond || ||   ||   ||   ||  ||  ||
|- align="center" bgcolor=""
| 34 || 04/16/13 || Maryland || The Diamond || ||   ||   ||   ||  ||  ||
|- align="center" bgcolor=""
| 35 || 04/17/13 || VMI || The Diamond || ||   ||   ||   ||  ||  ||
|- align="center" bgcolor=""
| 36 || 04/19/13 || at * || Woerner Field || ||   ||   ||   ||  ||  ||
|- align="center" bgcolor=""
| 37 || 04/20/13 || at Dayton* || Woerner Field || ||   ||   ||   ||  ||  ||
|- align="center" bgcolor=""
| 38 || 04/21/13 || at Dayton* || Woerner Field || ||   ||   ||   ||  ||  ||
|- align="center" bgcolor=""
| 39 || 04/23/13 || at Old Dominion(Hampton Classic'') || War Memorial Stadium || ||   ||   ||   ||  ||  ||
|- align="center" bgcolor=""
| 40 || 04/26/13 || at * || DeVincent Field || ||   ||   ||   ||  ||  ||
|- align="center" bgcolor=""
| 41 || 04/27/13 || at La Salle* || DeVincent Field || ||   ||   ||   ||  ||  ||
|- align="center" bgcolor=""
| 42 || 04/28/13 || at La Salle* || DeVincent Field || ||   ||   ||   ||  ||  ||
|- align="center" bgcolor=""
| 43 || 04/30/13 || #7 Virginia || The Diamond || ||   ||   ||   ||  ||  ||
|-

|- align="center" bgcolor=""
| 44 || 05/04/13 || * || The Diamond || ||   ||   ||   ||  || || 
|- align="center" bgcolor=""
| 45 || 05/05/13 || Saint Louis* || The Diamond || ||   ||   ||   ||  || || 
|- align="center" bgcolor=""
| 46 || 05/05/13 || Saint Louis* || The Diamond || ||   ||   ||   ||  || || 
|- align="center" bgcolor=""
| 47 || 05/08/13 || at Maryland || Shipley Field || ||   ||   ||   ||  || || 
|- align="center" bgcolor=""
| 48 || 05/10/13 || at * || Barcroft Park || ||   ||   ||   ||  || || 
|- align="center" bgcolor=""
| 49 || 05/11/13 || at George Washington* || Barcroft Park || ||   ||   ||   ||  || || 
|- align="center" bgcolor=""
| 50 || 05/12/13 || at George Washington* || Barcroft Park || ||   ||   ||   ||  || || 
|- align="center" bgcolor=""
| 51 || 05/14/13 || at Virginia || Davenport Field || ||   ||   ||   ||  || || 
|- align="center" bgcolor=""
| 52 || 05/16/13 || Richmond* || The Diamond || ||   ||   ||   ||  || || 
|- align="center" bgcolor=""
| 53 || 05/17/13 || Richmond* || The Diamond || ||   ||   ||   ||  || || 
|- align="center" bgcolor=""
| 54 || 05/18/13 || Richmond* || The Diamond || ||   ||   ||   ||  || || 
|-

|-  style="text-align:center; background:#fff;"
| 55 || 05/22/13 ||  TBD || Hayes Stadium ||  ||  ||  ||  ||  || – || –
|-  style="text-align:center; background:#fff;"
| 56 || 05/23/13 ||  TBD || Hayes Stadium ||  ||  ||  ||  ||  || – || –
|-  style="text-align:center; background:#fff;"
| 57 || 05/24/13 ||  TBD || Hayes Stadium ||  ||  ||  ||  ||  || – || –
|-  style="text-align:center; background:#fff;"
| 58 || 05/25/13 ||  TBD || Hayes Stadium ||  ||  ||  ||  ||  || – || –
|-

|-
| 
|-
| style="font-size:88%"|  * A-10 conference games.

Rankings

References 

Vcu
VCU Rams baseball seasons
VCU Rams baseball